The Donegal Railway Heritage Centre commemorates the operations of the County Donegal Railways Committee which operated two narrow-gauge railways in County Donegal from 1863 until 1959. The County Donegal Railway Restoration Society restored the centre, which opened in 1995 and is housed in the old station house in Donegal Town. Today, it operates as a visitor attraction comprising a museum, information centre and shop. On display are rolling stock, historical artefacts and an audio-visual presentation on the railways’ history.

Rolling stock
The centre owns several items of rolling stock, some awaiting restoration.

 Class 5 Locomotive, "Drumboe" built 1936, already (2021) restored
 Restored Series 2 Carriage #28 from 1893.
 Railcar #15, built 1936, awaiting restoration.
 Trailer #5, built 1929, awaiting restoration.

See also
 List of heritage railways in the Republic of Ireland

References

Sources
 Website of the County Donegal Railway Restoration Society
 Donegal Town Website
 Heritage Centre web page
Kits for many of the passenger coaches and locomotives are produced by Worsley Works - website

3 ft gauge railways in Ireland
Heritage Centre Railway
Heritage railways in the Republic of Ireland
Museums in County Donegal
Railway museums in the Republic of Ireland
Transport in County Donegal